Estádio Eduardo Guinle is a multi-use stadium located in Nova Friburgo, Brazil. It is used mostly for football matches and hosts the home matches of Friburguense Atlético Clube, Deportivo La Coruña Brasil Futebol Clube and Santa Cruz Futebol Clube. The stadium has a maximum capacity of 12,000 people.

External links
Templos do Futebol

Eduardo Guinle
Sports venues in Rio de Janeiro (state)